|}

The John of Gaunt Stakes is a Group 3 flat horse race in Great Britain open to horses aged four years or older. It is run at Haydock Park over a distance of 7 furlongs and 37 yards (1,442 metres), and it is scheduled to take place each year in late May or early June.

The event is named after John of Gaunt, the 1st Duke of Lancaster, who lived in the 14th century. It was formerly open to horses aged three or older, and it used to be classed at Listed level. The minimum age was raised to four in 1998, and the race was promoted to Group 3 status in 2008.

The race was sponsored by the Timeform organisation from 2009 to 2016 and was run as the Timeform Jury Stakes.

Records
Most successful horse since 1976 (2 wins):
 Warningford – 1999, 2002
 Main Aim – 2009, 2010

Leading jockey since 1986 (3 wins):
 Ryan Moore – Major Cadeaux (2008), Main Aim (2009, 2010)

Leading trainer since 1986 (4 wins):
 John Gosden – Mutakddim (1995), Decorated Hero (1997), Mount Abu (2001), Sleeping Indian (2005)

Winners since 1986

Earlier winners

 1976: Record Token
 1977: Gwent
 1978: Persian Bold
 1979: Borzoi
 1980: Hard Fought
 1981: Last Fandango
 1982: Indian King
 1983: no race
 1984: Mr Meeka
 1985: Sarab

See also
 Horse racing in Great Britain
 List of British flat horse races

References

 Paris-Turf:
 Racing Post:

 galopp-sieger.de – John of Gaunt Stakes.
 ifhaonline.org – International Federation of Horseracing Authorities – John of Gaunt Stakes (2019).
 pedigreequery.com – John of Gaunt Stakes – Haydock Park.
 

Flat races in Great Britain
Haydock Park Racecourse
Open mile category horse races